Onawa Lynn Lacy (born June 10, 1982) is an American attorney and former pageant contestant from Gamerco, New Mexico who has competed in the Miss USA pageant.Lacy won the Miss New Mexico USA 2006 title in a state pageant held in Las Cruces, New Mexico in October 2005.  It was Lacy's first attempt at the title. She became the first titleholder to hail from Gallup, New Mexico and the first of Native American origin. Lacy is Navajo.

Background
Lacy competed for the title of Miss USA in Baltimore, MD on April 21, 2006.  Onawa appeared on NBC's hit game show Deal or No Deal as briefcase model #15; MTV's Total Request Live; Fox New's Dayside; NBC's Today show; LIVE! with Regis and Kelly, and The Morning Show.  Onawa has also appeared in an issue of Trump Magazine.

Onawa is no stranger to pageantry, having previously held the titles of Miss Indian New Mexico 2001-2002 and Miss Indian World 2003–2004.

Lacy grew up in Gallup with her parents Rodney and Rena Lacy and has one older brother (Rodney Jr.) and one younger sister (Sheyenne). Onawa wed her husband, Zachary Haynes, on March 7, 2015, in Hau'ula, Hawai'i on O'ahu's North Shore. The couple share one son.

Lacy graduated from Gallup High School in 2000 and has since received her Bachelor of Arts degrees in English and Native American Studies from the University of New Mexico in 2006.  Onawa previously worked in Washington, D.C. as a Legislative Associate for Johnston & Associates, LLC lobbying for American Indian issues.  She lobbied on Capitol Hill alongside Navajo Code Talkers on behalf of the Esther Martinez Save Native Languages Act which was signed into law by President George W. Bush on December 12, 2006.  She studied Liberal Studies with an emphasis in International Government at Georgetown University in Washington, DC.  She is the first college graduate from her family. Onawa received her Juris Doctor from the University of New Mexico School of Law in May 2012 and practices as a criminal defense attorney.

Lacy is a member of the Order of Omega Honor Society and has received a number of academic awards, including placement on the National Dean's List, Clauve Outstanding Senior Award and American Indian Student Services Outstanding Senior Award.  She is also a founding member of the Delta chapter of Alpha Pi Omega sorority at the University of New Mexico.  In February 2007, Onawa was recognized by the New Mexico State legislators for her outstanding academic and community service work.

References

1982 births
Living people
People from Gallup, New Mexico
University of New Mexico alumni
Miss USA 2006 delegates
Georgetown University alumni
Navajo people
21st-century Native Americans
21st-century Native American women
American women lawyers
Native American lawyers